"Things Don't Seem" is the first single by Australian surf rock band Australian Crawl from their 1981 album Sirocco. It was produced by Peter Dawkins The song features one of the band's most complex pieces of lead guitar work, thanks to the skills of guitarist Simon Binks.

"Things Don't Seem" was released in May 1981 and reached #11 on the Australian Singles Charts.

Guy McDonough re-recorded the song for his solo album, My Place, which was released posthumously in 1985, by his brother, Bill McDonough. It was also included as the 'B' side to the first single, "My Place", taken from the album. The original Australian Crawl version featured James Reyne on vocals.

In January 2018, as part of Triple M's "Ozzest 100", the 'most Australian' songs of all time, "Things Don't Seem" was ranked number 78.

Track listing
 "Things Don't Seem" (Guy McDonough, Sean Higgins) - 3:55
"Big Fish" (James Reyne) - 2:42

Personnel
Credits:
Band members
 James Reyne — lead vocals, piano
 Simon Binks – lead guitar, slide guitar, acoustic guitar
 Guy McDonough — rhythm guitar
 Bill McDonough — drums, percussion
 Paul Williams — bass guitar
 Brad Robinson — rhythm guitar

Recording process
 Engineer – Dave Marett ("Things Don't Seem"), Ross Cockle ("Big Fish") 
 Producer – Peter Dawkins ("Things Don't Seem"), David Briggs ("Big Fish")

Charts

Weekly Charts

Year-end charts

References

1981 songs
Australian Crawl songs
EMI Records singles
Songs written by Guy McDonough
Song recordings produced by Peter Dawkins (musician)